South London is the southern part of London, England, south of the River Thames. The region consists of the boroughs, in whole or in part, of Bexley, Bromley, Croydon, Greenwich, Kingston, Lambeth, Lewisham, Merton, Richmond, Southwark, Sutton and Wandsworth.

South London originally emerged from Southwark, first recorded as Suthriganaweorc, meaning 'fort of the men of Surrey'. From Southwark, London then extended further down into northern Surrey and western Kent.

Emergence and growth

South London began at Southwark at the southern end of London Bridge, the first permanent crossing over the river, with early development of the area being a direct result of the existence and location of the bridge.

Southwark was first known as Suthriganaweorc, the fortress of the men of Surrey, mentioned in the Burghal Hidage as part of military system created by Alfred the Great to defeat the Great Heathen Army of the Vikings. Southwark was also known as the Borough due to be it being an incorporated (nationally represented) Borough from 1295. From 1550 to 1899 it was administered as part of the City of London and referred to as the ward of Bridge Without.

In 1720, John Strype's 'Survey of London' described Southwark as one of the then four distinct areas of London; in it he describes the City of London, Westminster (West London), Southwark (South London), and 'That Part Beyond the Tower' (East London). The area now usually referred to as North London developed later.
As late as the mid 18th century, however, there were no other bridges crossing the river and as a result urban growth was considerably slower in the south than in areas north of the Thames.

The opening of Westminster Bridge and other subsequent bridges to the west encouraged growth in the south-west, but only Tower Bridge was built to the east of London Bridge, so south-east London grew more slowly, at least until the Surrey Commercial Docks were built.

The development of a dense network of railway lines in the mid nineteenth century significantly accelerated growth. The County of London was formed in 1899, which incorporated these boroughs south of the river: Wandsworth, Lambeth, Battersea, Camberwell, Southwark, Bermondsey, Deptford, Lewisham, Greenwich and Woolwich. During the first half of the 20th century, towns in the Home Counties such as Kingston, Croydon and Bromley gradually coalesced with South London, until Greater London was formed in 1965.

Culture

Music

Transport
A significant feature of south London's economic geography is that while there are more than thirty bridges linking the area with West London and the City, there is only one, Tower Bridge, linking the area with East London.

Very little of London's underground rail network lies south of the river, largely due to the challenging geology; however, 21st-century technology makes tunnelling much cheaper (though stations are still expensive) and this may lead to an improved underground provision in south London with the Crossrail 2 line proposed alongside extensions to the Northern and Bakerloo Lines.

South London contains an extensive overground rail network and all of London's trams operate within the area.

List of boroughs
The 12 boroughs included, in whole or part are:

A small area of land, on which the southern end of Blackfriars Bridge stands, is not part of Southwark. It forms part of the City of London, a sui generis local authority which is mainly located north of the Thames.

Formal use
The term 'south London' has been used for a variety of formal purposes with the boundaries defined according to the purposes of the designation.

Constituency review, 2017
In 2017 the government asked the Boundary Commission for England to reconsider the boundaries of parliamentary constituencies. The commission's study, was to start with existing regions of England and then group the local authorities within that area into sub-regions for further sub-division. The south London sub-region included the 11 boroughs which lay south of the river, plus the parts of cross-river Richmond upon Thames that did so.

An earlier 2013 study, whose recommendations were not adopted, took a different approach by including all of Richmond in its south London sub-region.

Sub-region policy
For the purposes of progress reporting on the London Plan, there was a south London sub-region in operation from 2004 to 2008 consisting of Bromley, Croydon, Kingston, Merton, Richmond and Sutton. In 2001 this area had a population of 1,329,000. This definition is used by organisations such as Connexions.

Between 2008 and 2011 it was replaced with a South East sub-region consisting of Southwark, Lewisham, Greenwich, Bexley and Bromley and a South West sub-region consisting of Croydon, Kingston, Lambeth, Merton, Sutton, Richmond and Wandsworth.

In 2011 a new south London region was created consisting of Bromley, Croydon, the Royal Borough of Kingston upon Thames, Richmond upon Thames, Merton, Sutton, Wandsworth, Bexley, Greenwich and Lewisham.

Climate

South London is, like other parts of London and the UK in general, a temperate maritime climate according to the Köppen climate classification system. Three Met Office weather stations currently collect climate data south of the river; Kew, Hampton and Kenley Airfield, on the southern edge of the urban area. Long term climate observations dating back to 1763 are available for Greenwich, although observations ceased here in 2003.

Temperatures increase towards the Thames, firstly because of the urban warming effect of the surrounding area, but secondly due to altitude decreasing towards the river, meaning the southern margins of south London are often a couple of degrees cooler than those areas adjacent to the Thames. Often snow can be seen to lie on the North Downs near Croydon when central London is snow free.

The record high temperature at Greenwich is  recorded during August 2003. Sunshine is notably lower than other London area weather stations (by about 50–100 hours a year), suggesting Greenwich may be a fog trap in winter, and that the hillier land to the south may obscure early morning and late evening sunshine.

Although the Met Office accepts a higher reading from Brogdale in Kent, many have questioned the accuracy of this and regard the Kew reading as the most reliable highest UK temperature reading.

Associated organisations

South London Gallery
South London Botanical Institute
South London Press
South London Radio
South London Storm
South London Theatre

See also 
 Central London
 East London
 Inner London
 North London
 Outer London
 West London
 South Bank

References

External links

London sub-regions
Areas of London
Geography of London